Ferrier Hodgson  was a firm specialising in corporate recovery, corporate advisory, forensic accounting and forensic IT. The firm has a specialist management consulting arm called Azurium.

Ferrier Hodgson was established in 1976. It became one of the largest specialist corporate turnaround and insolvency management firms in the Asia Pacific. The group had eight offices across the major business centers in Australia, Malaysia and Singapore, with 34 partners and more than 320 staff across the region. Ferrier Hodgson was taken over by KPMG in March 2019.

Azurium
Ferrier Hodgson's specialist consulting arm, Azurium, was a specialist provider of enterprise improvement and advisory services with offices in Melbourne and Sydney. The Azurium team includes business architects, real estate professionals and experts in analytics, technology and valuation.

Media
Ferrier Hodgson was ranked number 15 in the BRW top 100 Accounting Firms in 2012 with an estimated $93 million in fee revenue during the 2011/12 financial year. The group's head office is located in Sydney.

References

External links
Ferrier Hodgson website
Azurium website

Accounting firms of Australia
Business services companies established in 1976
Business services companies disestablished in 2019
Companies based in Sydney
Financial services companies established in 1976
Financial services companies disestablished in 2019
1976 establishments in Australia
2019 disestablishments in Australia